Betty en NY (pronounced Betty en New York or Nueva York), is an American telenovela produced by Telemundo Global Studios for Telemundo based on the 1999 Colombian telenovela written by Fernando Gaitán, Yo soy Betty, la fea, which most popular recent version was La fea más bella starred Angélica Vale. The series stars Elyfer Torres as the titular character.

The trailer of the series was presented as Betty in NY, during the Telemundo's upfronts for the 2018–2019 television season. The start of production was announced on 27 November 2018. It premiered on 6 February 2019 and ended on 12 August 2019.

Plot 
The series revolves around Beatriz Aurora Rincón Lozano, an intelligent and capable young Mexican woman who lives in New York City who goes after her dreams, overcoming prejudices in a world where image is everything. After suffering six months of rejection in all jobs that she applies due to her lack of physical attractiveness, Betty decides to accept a job far below her abilities. Thus, after entering the sophisticated fashion company V&M Fashion, she becomes the personal secretary of the company president. Although she is ridiculed and humiliated on a daily basis for being completely lacking in style, Betty is more than willing to not be defeated in this ruthless war of appearances. While she is extremely competent and has great plans for personal growth, none of her many qualities will be able to help Betty find true love.

Cast 
 Elyfer Torres as Beatriz "Betty" Aurora Rincón
 Erick Elías as Armando Mendoza
 Sabrina Seara as Marcela Valencia
 Aarón Díaz as Ricardo Calderón
 Héctor Suárez Gomís as Hugo Lombardi
 César Bono as Demetrio Rincón
 Alma Delfina as Julia Lozano de Rincón
 Jeimy Osorio as Mariana González
 Sylvia Sáenz as Patricia Fernández
 Saúl Lisazo as Roberto Mendoza
 Mauricio Garza as Nicolás Ramos
 Sheyla Tadeo as Bertha Vargas
 Isabel Moreno as Inés "Inesita" Sandoval
 Amaranta Ruiz as Sofía Peña
 Mauricio Henao as Fabio
 Gloria Peralta as Margarita Del Valle Mendoza
 Pepe Suárez as Efraín Montes
 Verónica Schneider as Catalina Escarpa
 Rodolfo Salas as Daniel Valencia
 Freddy Flórez as Giovanni Castañeda
 Candela Márquez as Jenny Wendy Reyes
 Daniela Tapia as Aura María Andrade
 Jaime Aymerich as Charly Godines
 Polo Monárrez as Wilson Cuauhtémoc Márquez
 Valeria Vera as Sandra Fuentes
 Rykardo Hernández as Gregorio Mata
 Paloma Márquez as María Lucía Valencia
 Jimmie Bernal as Raymond Smith
 Michelle Taurel as Karla
 Gabriel Coronel as Nacho
 Fred Valle as Steve Parker
 Karen Carreño as Naomi Ferreti
 Suzy Herrera as Deisy
 Carl Mergenthaler as Mr. Anderson
 Salim Rubiales as Peter
 Sofía Reca as Romina
 Jorge Consejo as Frank
 Daniela Botero as Vanessa Palacios
 Laura Garrido as Cindy Anderson
 Willy Martin as Elvis
 Saúl Mendoza as Andrés
 Ángelo Jamaica as Manuel
 Santiago Jiménez
 Noah Rico as Efraín Jr. Montes
 Martín Fajardo as Jonathan Montes

Guest stars 
 Shannon de Lima as herself
 Jorge Enrique Abello as Armando Mendoza
 Gaby Espino as herself
 Valentina Ferrer as herself

Ratings 
  
}}

Episodes

Special

References

External links 
 

Yo soy Betty, la fea
Telemundo telenovelas
2019 American television series debuts
2019 American television series endings
2019 telenovelas
American telenovelas
Spanish-language American telenovelas
American television series based on telenovelas
American television series based on Colombian television series
Spanish-language television programming in the United States
Television shows set in New York City